Andreas Kriezis (Greek: Ανδρέας Κριεζής; 1813/1816 - c. 1880) was a Greek painter, primarily of portraits and maritime subjects.

Biography 
Andreas Kriezis was born on Hydra and was the son of a Captain of merchant vessel. Some sources claim that he was actually the brother of Prime Minister Antonios Kriezis, but this seems very unlikely and the relationship, if any, remains unclear.

Rather than follow his family's traditional maritime occupations, he went to Athens, where he worked as a lithographer at the Royal Printing House. In 1839, he went to Paris, to improve his skills in his chosen field, but turned to painting instead.

On his return to Greece in 1851, he taught drawing at the gymnasium in Syros. While there, he discovered and became an advocate for the young painter, Konstantinos Volanakis.  Later, he became an itinerant artist, travelling throughout the Saronic Gulf while competing in several exhibitions from 1859 to 1875.

Although mostly a portrait painter, he is known to have painted murals at the "Church of Saint Irene" on Poros. As a rule, he did not sign his works, so only a small number of canvases are attributed to him with certainty. His brushwork is very similar to that of Francesco Pige, an Italian-born painter who was his friend. In fact, many of Pige's early works were originally attributed to Kriezis. The authorship of many is still uncertain.

His death is generally believed to have come in 1880, but certainly after 1877.

Many of his works are in private collections, but may also be seen at the National Gallery of Greece, the Benaki Museum, and the Historical Museum of Hydra.

References

External links

1810s births
19th-century deaths
Year of birth uncertain
Year of death uncertain
19th-century Greek painters
Portrait painters
People from Hydra (island)